Anastasia Alexeyevna Gorshkova (born 13 March 1987) is a Russian former competitive ice dancer. She competed with Ilia Tkachenko from 2002 to 2006, coached by her father, Alexei Gorshkov. They won the bronze medal at the 2005 World Junior Championships and four medals on the ISU Junior Grand Prix series — two gold, one silver, one bronze. Gorshkova retired from competition in July 2006 due to a hip injury.

Further career 
 In pair with Alexander Belov she participated in “Star Ice” TV show produced by RTR Russia channel in 2008.
 Anastasia Gorshkova participates in the ice show “Sleeping Beauty” of Ilia Averbukh’s theatre and “The Imperial Ice Stars” company.
 In 2017 she won “Mrs France 2017” title and then in Durban, South Africa, she took part in the 40th Annual Mrs Universe Pageant and won “Vice - Mrs Universe” title.

Programs 
(with Tkachenko)

Competitive highlights 
(with Tkachenko)

References

External links
 

Russian female ice dancers
1987 births
Living people
Sportspeople from Yekaterinburg
World Junior Figure Skating Championships medalists